The National Unity Cabinet was the Indonesian Cabinet which served under President Abdurrahman Wahid and Vice President Megawati Sukarnoputri from 29 October 1999 until 23 July 2001. The Cabinet was formed after Wahid and Megawati were elected President and Vice President by the People's Consultative Assembly (MPR). The Cabinet was originally designed to look after the interests of the various political parties and the Indonesian National Armed Forces but this notion quickly disappeared as Wahid's presidency began to break down.

Members

State Ministers
State Minister of Research and Technology: A. S. Hikam
State Minister of Cooperatives and Small to Medium Businesses: Zarkasih Nur
State Minister of Environment: Soni Keraf
State Minister of Regional Autonomy: Ryaas Rasyid
State Minister of Tourism and Arts: Hidayat Jaelani
State Minister of Investment and State Owned Enterprises: Laksamana Sukardi
State Minister of Youth and Sports: Mahadi Sinambela
State Minister of Female Empowerment: Khofifah Indar Parawansa
State Minister of Public Works: Rafig Budiro Sucipto
State Minister of Human Rights: Hasballah M. Saad
State Minister of Transmigration and Population: Hilal Hamdi
State Minister of State Apparatus Utilization: Vice Admiral Freddy Numberi
State Minister of Public Issues: A. A. Gde Agung

Officials With Ministerial Rank
Commander of the Armed Forces: Admiral Widodo A. S.
Attorney General: Marzuki Darusman
State Secretary: Ali Rahman

Changes (up to August 2000)
26 November 1999: Hamzah Haz resigned from the Cabinet and was replaced by Basri Hasanuddin as Coordinating Minister of People's Welfare and Abolition of Poverty.
4 January 2000: Ali Rahman resigned as State Secretary and was replaced by Bondan Gunawan
February 2000: Wiranto was replaced by Suryadi Sudirja as Coordinating Minister of Politics, Social, and Security. Suryadi retains his position as Minister of Home Affairs.
24 April 2000: Jusuf Kalla and Laksamana Sukardi were replaced by Luhut Binsar Panjaitan and Rozi Munir as Minister of Industry and Trade and State Minister of Investment and State Owned Enterprises respectively.
29 May 2000: Bondan Gunawan resigned as State Secretary and was replaced by Djohan Effendi.
10 August 2000: Kwik Kian Gie resigned as Coordinating Minister of Economics, Finance, and Industry.

Reshuffle
On 23 August 2000, Wahid announced an extensive reshuffle of the Cabinet. He not only moved Ministers to other positions but also removed ministers from the Cabinet and introduced new names to the Cabinet. In terms of organization, Wahid merged Ministries, changed the names of various Ministries and in some cases actually abolishing them.

Coordinating Ministers
Coordinating Minister of Politics, Social, and Security: Gen. (ret.) Susilo Bambang Yudhoyono
Coordinating Minister of Economics, Finance, and Security: Rizal Ramli

Departmental Ministers
Minister of Home Affairs and Regional Autonomy: Lt. Gen. (ret.) Suryadi Sudirja
Minister of Foreign Affairs: Alwi Shihab
Minister of Defense: Mahfud MD
Minister of Finance: Priyadi Prapto Suhardjo
Minister of Religious Affairs: Tolchah Hasan
Minister of Agriculture and Forestry: Bungaran Saragih
Minister of Education: Yahya Muhaimin
Minister of Health and Social Welfare: Achmad Sujudi
Minister of Transportation and Telecommunications: Lt. Gen. Agum Gumelar
Minister of Manpower and Transmigration: Al Hilal Hamdi
Minister of Industry and Trade: Luhut Panjaitan
Minister of Energy and Mineral Resources: Purnomo Yusgiantoro
Minister of Justice and Human Rights: Yusril Ihza Mahendra
Minister of Settlement and Regional Infrastructure: Erna Witoelar
Minister of Culture and Tourism: I Gede Ardika
Minister of Maritime Affairs and Fisheries: Sarwono Kusumaatmaja

State Ministers
State Minister of Female Empowerment/Chairwoman of Planned Families National Coordinating Body (BKKBN): Khofifah Indar Parawansa
State Minister of Administrative Reform: Ryaas Rasyid
State Minister of Cooperatives and Small to Medium Businesses: Zarkaish Nur
State Minister of Environment: Soni Keraf
State Minister of Research and Technology: A. S. Hikam

Junior Minister
Junior Minister of Forestry: Nurmahmudi Ismail
Junior Minister of Acceleration of Development in Eastern Indonesia: Manuel Kaisiepo
Junior Minister of National Economic Restructuring: Cacuk Sudarijanto

Officials With Ministerial Rank
Commander of the Armed Forces: Admiral Widodo A. S.
Attorney General: Marzuki Darusman

Changes (up to June 2001)
3 January 2001: Ryaas Rasyid resigns as State Minister of Administrative Reform. He was never replaced.
7 February 2001: Yusril Ihza Mahendra resigns as Minister of Justice and Human Rights. He was replaced by Baharuddin Lopa.
15 March 2001: Nurmahmudi Ismail was replaced by Marzuki Usman as Junior Minister of Forestry.

Second reshuffle
On 1 June 2001, with the situation rapidly deteriorating around him, Wahid announced another reshuffle. The changes were:
Susilo Bambang Yudhoyono was replaced as Coordinating Minister of Politics, Social, and Security by Agum Gumelar.
Budi Mulyawan Suyitno appointed as Minister of Transportation and Telecommunications.
Marzuki Darusman was replaced by Baharuddin Lopa as Attorney General.
Marsillam Simanjuntak appointed as Minister of Justice and Human Rights.
Sarwono Kusumaatmaja was replaced as Minister of Maritime Affairs and Fisheries by Rohmin Dauri
The Junior Ministry of National Economic Restructuring is abolished

Third reshuffle
Wahid announced another reshuffle on 12 June 2001. The changes were:
Prijadi Prapto Suhardjo was replaced by Rizal Ramli as Minister of Finance.
Burhanuddin Abdullah appointed as Coordinating Minister of Economics, Finance, and Industry.
Anwar Supriyadi appointed as State Minister of Administrative Reform.

Changes
5 July 2001: Marzuki Darusman was appointed Cabinet Secretary

Fourth reshuffle
Wahid announced his fourth and final reshuffle on 10 July 2001. This reshuffle was prompted by Baharuddin Lopa's death. The changes were:
Baharuddin Lopa died and was replaced by Marsillam Simanjuntak as Attorney General.
Mahfud was appointed Minister of Justice and Human Rights.
Agum Gumelar was appointed Minister of Defense whilst holding the Coordinating Ministry of Politics, Social, and Security.

References
 
 Changes in Wahid's Cabinet

Post-Suharto era
Cabinets of Indonesia
1999 establishments in Indonesia
2001 disestablishments in Indonesia
Cabinets established in 1999
Cabinets disestablished in 2001